Grand Master of the Knights may refer to:

 List of Grand Masters of the Knights Hospitaller
 Grand Masters of the Knights Templar
 List of Knights Templar
 Grand Masters of the Teutonic Order